Frank Wadsworth may refer to:

Frank H. Wadsworth (1915–2022), American forester and conservationist
Frank W. Wadsworth (1919–2012), American Shakespearean scholar, author, and sportsman